Fraidy Reiss is a United States-based activist against forced marriage, child marriage, and teenage marriage.

Life
Reiss was raised Haredi Jewish in Brooklyn, New York. According to an interview, she was arranged to be married to a man she had known for three months, at 19 years old.  She married the man and had two children with him.

According to Reiss, in the first week of her marriage, her then-husband showed signs of abusive behavior—which included that he repeatedly threatened to kill her and engaged in other forms of violence  Reiss says she only realized that she was experiencing domestic violence when she spoke with a therapist outside of her community. Her community members nonetheless encouraged her to stay with her husband. After a particular episode of violence, Reiss went to get a temporary restraining order, and was the first woman in her community to do so. However, she says her rabbi sent an attorney (who was also from the ultra-Orthodox Jewish community) to take Reiss to family court, to tell the judge that she wished to drop the order. Reiss was able to go to college and get a job, and thus, she felt that she was able to support her family, and leave her husband and get a divorce. She says she developed a five-year escape plan.

Reiss graduated at 32 from Rutgers University, and was commencement speaker. She began work as a journalist. Reiss left her husband after twelve years of marriage, and was shunned by her family and community after doing so. She finally was able to obtain a divorce three years later after leaving him. Reiss subsequently left Judaism, and became an atheist. Reiss has not spoken to her family since then, save for her sister on occasion.

In 2016, it was announced that Reiss would become the subject of a documentary by production company Women Rising. Sara Hirsh Bordo will direct the documentary, and production on it was scheduled to begin in fall of 2016.

Activism
In 2011, Reiss founded the non-profit organization Unchained At Last, to support women who wish to leave arranged and forced marriages. Helping minors is difficult, but Unchained does what it can, including changing laws to prevent minors from being legally entered into marriage in the United States. The organization is incorporated in New Jersey. Unchained At Last serves people from various communities. The organization tailors services to each client's background. Unchained At Last offers legal assistance and other direct services for the women. The organization also helps the women with social services, so that they can continue with their lives, as well as mentoring. Reiss has also participated in a planning session held by the White House Council on Women and Girls that would target development of a national policy on forced and arranged marriages. Reiss also collaborated with New Jersey senator Loretta Weinberg on a draft of a law that would allow women to access crime victimization records free of charge. This would allow the women to use those records as proof to obtain restraining orders. As of 2016, the organization has assisted over 250 women.

Upon learning about the widespread phenomenon of marriage under the age of 18 in the United States, Reiss took on ending marriage under the age of 18 in all 50 U.S. states. In 2018, the first two U.S. states - Delaware and New Jersey - signed laws ending all marriage before 18, due to Unchained At Last's activism and assistance. Also in 2018, American Samoa, a U.S. territory, ended child marriage. Pennsylvania, Minnesota and the U.S. Virgin Islands followed in 2020. As of 2020, several other states have introduced similar legislation to end marriage under the age of 18.

Media 
Reiss has written several op-eds for outlets like The Washington Post, The Star-Ledger, CNN, The Hill, and Refinery29 (co-authored by Chelsea Clinton). Reiss has also been interviewed about her personal story and her activism by several major news outlets, including The New York Times, NPR, Al Jazeera America, PBS Newshour, BBC, CBS News, NowThis, and more. In 2017, Forbes named Reiss one of five women who are tackling some of the world's "most urgent issues". Reiss was featured in Great Big Story's "Defenders" series about fearless, headstrong, undeterred women fighting for change in the spirit of Ruth Bader Ginsburg, and was one of the titular "gutsy women" featured in Hillary and Chelsea Clinton's 2019 book, The Book of Gutsy Women and subsequent Apple TV+ docuseries, Gutsy.

Reiss lent her expertise to the A&E documentary, I Was a Child Bride: The Untold Story, with Elizabeth Vargas, in 2019. In 2018, Reiss gave a TED talk at TEDxFoggyBottom titled, "America's forced marriage problem".

See also
 Child marriage in the United States

References

Further reading
 Why Fraidy Reiss founded Unchained At Last - a Washington Post interview with Fraidy Reiss
How a bride forced to marry became ‘unchained at last’ - Al Jazeera America
Woman Breaks Through Chains of Forced Marriage, and Helps Others Do the Same - The New York Times
Why can 12-year-olds still get married in the United States? - a Washington Post op-ed by Fraidy Reiss
An American 13-Year-Old, Pregnant and Married to Her Rapist - a New York Times op-ed by Nicholas Kristof
Unchained at Last Aims to End Child and Forced Marriages - a NJ Monthly profile

Living people
People from Brooklyn
Year of birth missing (living people)
21st-century American women